The Rock 'n' Roll Worship Circus was a band from Kelso, Washington, U.S.

History
The band began as worship team members in a church undergoing changes in the mid-1990s. Their transition to a nationally touring act came in 2001 after the release of their first full-length album, entitled Big Star Logistics.  In 2002, the band signed with Vertical Music, a subsidiary of Integrity Label Group, and released "Welcome to the Rock 'n' Roll Worship Circus", a 60's flavored blend of congregational, humorous, and personal worship songs.  The album was nominated for 4 GMA Dove Awards, and won the award for "Best Art Packaging". It peaked at #31 on Billboard's Top Contemporary Christian Albums chart. In 2003, the band's contract was given to INO Records, another subsidiary of Integrity Label Group, and the band's second album titled A Beautiful Glow was released. The band was dropped after lack of radio play and album sales had failed label expectations.  In 2004, the band released their last recorded work titled The Listening EP, toured internationally with Delirious?, and played major festivals worldwide.

Remaining members
Some remaining members of the Worship Circus continue on in music today. Bobby Love has joined BEC Records band Telecast.  Mark and Terry Nelson have formed Portland based band The Shiny Things.  Zurn P. Praxair performs under the identities of P. The Clown, and Zwasco.  Gabriel Wilson, Chris Greely, Eric Lemiere, and Josiah Sherman went on to form The Listening, releasing The Listening LP in 2005.

Discography
1999--Live at Tomfest
2000--Little Star Logistics
2001--Big Star Logistics
2002--Welcome to the Rock 'n' Roll Worship Circus (Vertical/Integrity)
2003--A Beautiful Glow (INO/Integrity)

External links 
 "Interview" - Jesus Freak Hideout
 "Billboard" - Google Books
 "Christian Rock For Muslims" - New York Times
 "Worship band may be the 'greatest show on earth'" - Baptist Press
 [ "Welcome to the Rock and Roll Worship Circus" - All Music]
 [ "A Beautiful Glow" - All Music]

References

American Christian musical groups
Musical groups from Washington (state)
Musical groups established in 1999
Musical groups disestablished in 2004
1999 establishments in Washington (state)